The Bay Rivers District is an athletic district of the Virginia High School League which includes schools in the Hampton Roads metropolitan area. The district was formed in 1990 with the consolidation of schools from the York River District and Peanut District schools. The schools in the Bay Rivers District compete in 2A, 3A, and 4A.  Since 2013, the district is only used for the regular season.

Facts About the District
The schools in the Bay Rivers District are located in or south of the Virginia Peninsula.  Schools in the Bay Rivers District in particular are home to the Historic Triangle which are three Virginia colonial communities and areas which have important significance in the founding of the United States.  First is Jamestown, the location of the first permanent British settlement in North America.  Second is Williamsburg, home of the Colonial capital which is located in the Colonial Williamsburg historic district; Busch Gardens which is one of the most popular theme parks in the United States; and The College of William & Mary, which is the second oldest university in the United States and alma mater of Thomas Jefferson.  The third city is Yorktown, which is the site of the Siege of Yorktown, where the British surrendered to the Continental Army on October 17, 1781, unofficially ending the American Revolutionary War.

Though much of the Historic Triangle area is considered to be a "retirement villa," this area is a rapidly growing area in general in the Commonwealth without regard to age, to the point where the Williamsburg/James City County school system opened Warhill High School in the 2007–2008 school year, reducing enrollments at Jamestown and Lafayette and creating the tenth member in the district.

Member schools

Former members
Franklin High School of Franklin, Virginia (moved to Group A)
Lakeland High School of Suffolk, Virginia (moved to Group AAA)
Nansemond River High School of Suffolk, Virginia (moved to Group AAA)
Southampton High School of Courtland, Virginia (moved to Southside District)

Champions

See also
Peninsula District – The other VHSL district on the Virginia Peninsula, mainly for the larger high schools in Hampton and Newport News.

References

Sports in Hampton Roads
Virginia High School League